Chernivtsi (see also other names) is a city in the historical region of Bukovina, which is now divided along the borders of Romania and Ukraine, including this city, which is situated on the upper course of the Prut river in the Southwestern Ukrainian territory. Chernivtsi serves as the administrative center for the Chernivtsi raion, the Chernivtsi urban hromada, and the oblast itself.

The first document that refers to this city dates back to 1408, when Chernivtsi was a town in the region of Moldavia, formerly as a defensive fortification, and became the center of Bukovina in 1488. In 1538, Chernivtsi was under the control of the Principality of Moldavia under Ottoman Empire suzerainty, and the Moldavian control lasted for two centuries until 1774, when Austria took control of Bukovina in the aftermath of the Russo-Turkish War. Chernivtsi (known at that time as ) became the center of the Galicia's Bukovina District until 1848, later becoming the Duchy of Bukovina until 1918. Chernivtsi was under the control of Ukraine since 1940, though the Soviet Union collapsed, which affected the independence of the country.

Chernivtsi is viewed as one of Western Ukraine's main cultural centers. The city is also considered one of Ukraine's important educational and architectural sites. Historically a cosmopolitan community, Chernivtsi was once dubbed "Little Vienna" and "Jerusalem upon the Prut". Chernivtsi is twinned with seven other cities around the world. The city is a major regional rail and road transportation hub, also housing an international airport.

Names 

In the times of Halych-Volyn Principality the city's name was Chern.

In "Documents of Western Russia" published in Saint Petersburg in 1846 (Volume 1, page 32, document #21), the city is mentioned as Chernov'tsi.

History

Prehistory 
Archaeological evidence discovered in the area surrounding Chernivtsi indicates that a population inhabited it since the Neolithic era. Later settlements included those of the Cucuteni-Trypillian culture, the Corded Ware culture; artifacts from the Bronze and Iron Ages were also found in the city. In the Middle Ages there lived East Slavic tribes White Croats and Tivertsi.

Under Principality of Halych 
A fortified settlement located on the left (north-eastern) shore of the Prut dates back to the time of the Principality of Halych and is thought to have been built by Grand Prince Yaroslav Osmomysl. Legendary accounts refer to this fortress-city as Chern''', or Black city; it is said to owe its name to the black color of the city walls, built from dark oak layered with local black-colored soil. This early stronghold was destroyed during the Mongol invasion of Europe by Boroldai in 1259. However, the remaining ramparts of the fortress were still used for defense purposes; in the 17th century they were augmented with several bastions, one of which is still extant.

Following the destruction of the fortress, later settlements in the area centered on the right (south-western) shore of the Prut River, at a more strategically advantageous, elevated location. In 1325, when the Kingdom of Poland seized control of Galicia, and came into contact with the early Vlach (Romanian) feudal formations, a fort was mentioned under the name Țețina; it was defending the ford and crossing point on the Prut River. It was part of a group of three fortifications; the other two being the fortress of Hotin on the Dniester to the east, and a fort on the Kolachin River, an upriver tributary of Prut.

 Under Principality of Moldavia 
Between 1359 and 1775, the city and its surroundings were part of the Principality of Moldavia, one of the historic provinces of Romania; the city being the administrative center of the homonymous ținut (county). The name Cernăuți/Chernivtsi is first attested in a document by Alexandru cel Bun (Alexander the Good) on 8 October 1408. In Ottoman sources, the city was mentioned as "Çernovi", a phonetic transliteration of a Latin cognomen meaning new castle (see French Castelnau or Welsh Carno).

 Under Austro-Hungarian rule 
In 1775, the northwestern part of the territory of Moldavia was annexed by the Habsburg Empire; this region became known as Bukovina. The city became the region's capital, organized as the Bukovina District part of the Kingdom of Galicia and Lodomeria, which in 1849 was raised in status and became known as the Duchy of Bukovina, a crownland of the Austrian Empire. The city received Magdeburg rights. The city began to flourish in 1778 when Knight Karl von Enzenberg was appointed the chief of the Military Administration. He invited many merchants, craftsmen and entrepreneurs to help develop trade and other businesses. Saint Peter's Fairs (1–15 July) had given a new vibrant impulse to the market development from 1786. In the late 19th century the German language—due to the Habsburg and the very important Jewish influence—became the lingua franca and more and more newspapers were edited in German, also a remarkable literary production in German began in this period, featuring most prominently Karl Emil Franzos.

During the 19th and early 20th century, Chernivtsi became a center of both Romanian and Ukrainian national movements. In 1908, it was the site of the first Yiddish language conference, the Czernowitz Conference, coordinated by Nathan Birnbaum. When Austria-Hungary dissolved in 1918, followed by two years of political uncertainty in Europe due to the aftermath of World War I, the city and its surrounding area became part of the Kingdom of Romania, which gained worldwide diplomatic recognition by the end of 1920. During those two years, even most city residents did not know of which country they were citizens, with most assuming Czernowitz still belonged to Austria-Hungary. German remained the lingua franca of the city and its suburbs for another decade. In 1930, the city reached a population of 112,400: 26.8% Jews, 23.2% Romanians, 20.8% Germans, 18.6% Ukrainians, the remainder Poles and others. It was one of the five university centers of interwar Romania.

 Soviet occupation and rule 

In 1940, the Red Army occupied the area; the area around the city became known as Chernivtsi Oblast, and was allotted to the Ukrainian SSR by the Soviet Union. The city's large Romanian intelligentsia found refuge in Romania; while the Bukovina Germans were "repatriated" according to a Soviet-Nazi agreement. Under the regime of military dictator Ion Antonescu, Romania had switched from an ally of France and Britain to one of Nazi Germany; subsequently, in July 1941, the Romanian Army retook the city as part of the Axis attack on the Soviet Union during World War II. Chernivtsi would become the capital of the Romanian Bukovina Governorate. In August 1941, Antonescu ordered the creation of a ghetto in the lowland part of the city, where 50,000 Bukovina Jews were crammed, two-thirds of whom would be deported in October 1941 and early 1942 to Transnistria, where the majority died. The Romanian mayor of the city Traian Popovici managed to persuade Antonescu to raise the number of Jews exempted from deportation from 200 to 20,000.
	
In 1944, when Axis forces were driven out by the Red Army, the city was reincorporated into the Ukrainian SSR. Over the following years, most of the Jews emigrated to Israel; the city was an important node in the Berihah network. Bukovina Poles were expelled by the Soviets after World War II. The city became a predominantly Ukrainian one.

 Independence 
Since 1991, Chernivtsi has been a part of an independent Ukraine. In May 1999, Romania opened a consulate general in the city.

Until 18 July 2020, Chernivtsi was designated as a city of oblast significance and did not belong to any raion. As part of the administrative reform of Ukraine, which reduced the number of raions of Chernivtsi Oblast to three, the city was merged into Chernivtsi Raion.

2022 Russian invasion of Ukraine

Since the start of the invasion, the city has been a host for refugees from the fighting in eastern and central Ukraine and a resting point for refugees on their way to nearby Romania. Some Chernivsti residents have also left the country.

 Symbolics 

 Coat of arms 
The Chernivtsi coat of arms is framed by a bronze ornamental cartouche, and a red heraldic shield depicting an open stone gate with a figured trident in the middle. Under the gate, there are two crossed laurel branches, tied with ribbons. The crown of the symbol is the stone crown.

 Flag of Chernivtsi 
The Chernivtsi flag consists of a tree, the top, and a rectangular cloth, the front of which forms framed by a red tooth-like ornament white background with an inscription in Ukrainian in the center, over which there is inscribed in Ukrainian: "Chernivtsi". Under the coat of arms, there is the sign "1408" – the date of the first written mention of the city. On both sides of the coat of arms and all four corners of the field are filled with floral ornaments and with the addition of two beech branches with nuts and leaves. The reverse side is formed by a yellow background with the coat of arms of Ukraine in the center with frames and ornaments similar to the front side.

 Honorary chain of the mayor of Chernivtsi 
The mayor's honorary chain is a symbol of Chernivtsi mayor's authority, which is served on behalf of the territorial community. Founded in 1908 and restored in 2008. The symbol is a medallion with the inscription engraved on it: "From Chernivtsi community to freely elected head", on the reverse – "The foundation of a free state is a free community". The medallion is attached to a chain consisting of stylized coats of arms Ukraine, Chernivtsi region and the city of Chernivtsi. The symbol is made of gold colour metal.

 Medal "To the glory of Chernivtsi" 
The medal "To the glory of Chernivtsi" is an honorary distinction of the Chernivtsi City Council, introduced to the 600th Anniversary of Chernivtsi (2008) in order to reward individuals who actively contributed to the prosperity of the city and its promotion in Ukraine and the world. The award is made of silver-gilt, it has a circle shape with a diameter of 28 mm (1"). The medal's strip is white with red stripes, which corresponds to the colours of the Chernivtsi flag. At the bottom of the strip, there is a beech branch. The obverse depicts the emblem of Chernivtsi and the inscription – "To the glory of Chernivtsi". On the reverse – the official Chernivtsi logo, designed and approved for the anniversary. The medal is awarded, according to the decision of the executive committee of the City Council, annually during the celebration of the city day.

The official motto of modern Chernivtsi, "Спільними зусиллями!", is a Ukrainian-language version of the Latin Viribus Unitis ("With United Forces"), the personal motto of Franz Joseph, who personally bestowed the right to use it on Chernivtsi. This indicates a special attitude of the emperor to the city. Along with the capital of Bukovina, only the first naval ship of the Austro-Hungarian Navy (SMS Viribus Unitis) was honoured with such honour.

 Logotype of Chernivtsi 
The official ''Chernivtsi 600'' logo was developed and approved by the anniversary of the city in 2008. It was recognized so successful that it continues to be used. The main idea of components for emblem is based on the antiquity of the city, its exceptional architectural heritage and the hard work of its inhabitants. The symbol is made in the form of a blacksmith's work of art, which testifies to the soundness, prosperity, and success. The color scheme of the logo, represented by dark blue and yellow, has a higher degree of comfortable contrast and coincides with the colors of the State Flag of Ukraine.

In the early 2010s, a new city logo was developed and approved, and at the same time the official slogan was affixed: "Chernivtsi is unique in diversity". Old and new symbols of Chernivtsi were chosen for its creation. To the left, in the foreground, there is a trumpet player who wins the trumpet tune "Marichka". In the middle of the background, there is the town hall. The former Metropolitan Residence of Bukovina and Dalmatia which is recognized as the architectural pearl of the city is pictured to the right in the background.

The colour scheme of the logo represented in orange, blue and red, the name is purple. Such a combination is characteristic of tourism, which uses the notion of happiness, well-being, the joy of relaxation, visualizing positive symbols and images in a colourful, warm and vibrant colour scheme. The new logo uses old symbols from the "Chernivtsi 600" logo.

 Geography and climate 
Chernivtsi is located in the historic region of Bukovina, which is currently shared between Romania (south) and Ukraine (north). Chernivtsi is located in the southwest of Ukraine, in the eastern Carpathians, on the border between the Carpathians and the East European Plain, 40 km (25 miles) from the border with Romania. The city lies 248 meters (817') above sea level and is surrounded by forests and fields. The River Prut runs through the city's landscape. The city is located in the Eastern European time zone in the region of meridian 26.

Chernivtsi is located at the intersection of the transport arteries: E85, H03, and H10

 Climate 
The city is located in a temperate climate zone. The climate is continental with mild winters and warm summers. The average annual temperature is +8,6 °C (47 °F), the lowest in January (-2,9 °C; 27 °F), the highest – in July (+19,8 °C; 68 °F). Winter weather usually comes on 28 November and ends 9 March; summer weather begins on 20 May, and ends on 10 September. The average annual rainfall in Chernivtsi is 621 mm ("), with the lowest – in October and January–February, the highest – in June–July. Sometimes there are heavy rains during the summer. Snow cover is formed each winter, but its altitude is insignificant. The average wind speed ranges from 3.3 m/s (7 mph) in July to 4.0 m/s (9 mph) in January. The average annual humidity is 77%.

 Landscape 
According to the functional purpose the lands of the city are divided as follows: land of residential and public buildings (64%), lands of agricultural purpose (17%), lands of industry (9%), lands of recreational and environmental purpose (5%), lands of general use (3%), commercial land (2%).

The main water source of Chernivtsi is the Prut River in its upper reaches, which divides the city in half. Besides, there are six small streams and nine lakes within the city.

The relief is characterized by significant relief dip – from 150 metres (492') above sea level in the Prut valleys to 537 metres (1762') in the western outskirts (Mount Tsetzino), which is caused by the location on the Chernivtsi Upland.

Chernivtsi is considered to be a "green city": the large territory is occupied by parks, squares, gardens, alleys and flower gardens. Nine objects are recognized as monuments of landscape art. The city has a botanical garden at the Yuriy Fedkovych National University with a unique orangery. Among the relict plants growing in the botanical garden, a special place is occupied by a giant Sequoiadendron.

Chernivtsi is located in the center of Chernivtsi Regional Park, which borders zakaznik "Thetzino" in the west and Mount Berda in the north.

 State of the environment 
At the end of the twentieth century, the main pollutants of the Chernivtsi environment were industrial enterprises, including the MIC. In the 1990s much of them ceased to exist or significantly reduced production capacity and thus reduced industrial emissions. Despite this, 58 enterprises (38.4% of the total amount in the region) are the main pollutants of the environment. Approximately 1.2 tonnes of pollutants are released into the air annually (34.9% of the total area emissions). Non-methane volatile organic compounds, carbon dioxide and substances in the form of solid suspended solids predominate in the structure of the emitted pollutants. In addition, carbon dioxide, which has a greenhouse effect, is periodically released into the atmosphere of the city. Emissions from stationary sources were 7.9 tonnes per  of Chernivtsi territory.

In 2008, Chernivtsi established an Environmental Monitoring System (EMS), an information structure that integrates environmental monitoring organizations and industrial enterprises that pollute the environment or which may adversely affect the environment or its components.

Since the late 1990s, transport is a significant factor in the negative impact on the environment. To some extent, the situation was improved with the construction of the first (2004) and the second (2010) queues of the bypass road, which connected the directions "Kyiv-Chernivtsi" and "Chernivtsi-Suceava". The problem of transit transport in the city will be finally resolved after the construction of the third branch of the bypass road, which will connect the directions "Suceava-Chernivtsi" and "Chernivtsi-Lviv".

 Government and subdivisions 

Chernivtsi is the administrative center of the Chernivtsi Oblast (province) and the city itself has own government within the oblast under direct subordination to oblast.

The territory of Chernivtsi is divided into three administrative city raions (districts):

The current mayor of Chernivtsi is Roman Klichuk, who has been elected in 2020 Ukrainian local elections.

 Demographics 

According to the latest All-Ukrainian population census in 2001, the population of Chernivtsi was approximately 240,600 people of 65 nationalities.  Among them, 189,000 (79.8%) are Ukrainians; 26,700 (11.3%) Russians; 10,500 (4.4%) Romanians; 3,800 (1.6%) Moldovans; 1,400 (0.6%) Polish; 1,300 (0.6%) Jews; 2,900 (1.2%) other nationalities.

Based on the last available Soviet data, the population of the city, as of 1 January 1989, was approximately 295,000 residents. Among these, there are some 172,000 Ukrainians, 46,000 Russians, 16,000 Romanians, 13,000 Moldovans, 7,000 Poles and others.

The Romanian population in Chernivtsi started decreasing rapidly after 1950. Many Romanians fled to Romania or were deported to Siberia (where most of them died), and the remaining Romanian population quickly became a minority and assimilated with the majority. Nowadays, the Romanian minority in Chernivtsi is still decreasing as a result of forced cultural assimilation enforced by the Ukrainian authorities and emigration to Romania.

Chernivtsi once had a Jewish community of over 50,000, less than a third of whom survived World War II. Romanian lawyer and reserve officer Theodor Criveanu, as well as the then city mayor Traian Popovici, supported by General Vasile Ionescu saved 19,689 Jewish people. Initially, Governor of Bukovina Corneliu Calotescu allowed only 190 Jewish people to stay, but Traian Popovici, after an incredible effort, obtained from the then dictator of Romania Marshal Ion Antonescu an allowance of 20,000. After World War II, the city was a key node in the Berihah network, which helped Jews to emigrate to the then Mandate Palestine from the difficult conditions after the War. Following the collapse of the Soviet Union in 1991, the majority of the remaining Jewish population emigrated to Israel and the United States. A famous member of this latter emigration is the actress Mila Kunis.

Chernivtsi was inhabited by Ukrainians, Romanians, Poles, Ruthenians, Jews, Roma, and Germans. During its affiliation with the Austro-Hungarian monarchy, Chernivtsi enjoyed prosperity and culture as the capital of the Bukovina crown land. Until 1918, the main language of the city was German, which, in addition to the Germans, was also spoken by Jews (together they made up half the population of the city) and even partly by Ukrainians, Romanians and Poles. After World War II, the Shoah and Porajmos, and the resettlement and expulsion of the whole ethnic groups, including Germans and Romanians, this status was diminished. Today, the Ukrainians are the dominant population group.

Chernivtsi's change in demographic diversity is demonstrated by the following population statistics. Once, Romanians and Ukrainians formed the majority of the population. However, after 1870, Yiddish-speaking or German-speaking Jews surpassed the Romanians as the largest population group of the town. After 1880, the Ukrainians surpassed the Romanians as the second-largest population group.

 Language composition of the population 
Ethno-linguistic composition of the population of the former districts of the city (native languages according to the 2001 census).

 Economy 
The total number of economic entities in the city is 25.4 thousand. On 1 January 2006, there were 6739 legal entities – business entities and almost 19,000 private entrepreneurs – individuals, primarily represented by small enterprises. The volume of sales and services provided to small enterprises is UAH 578 million or 22% of the total Chernivtsi volumes. The share of the city's tax revenues is almost 35%. The most attractive for small businesses are trade and services, restaurant and tourist business.

Wholesale and retail trade, industry and construction are successfully developing in Chernivtsi. In 2005, wholesale and retail sales accounted for over 64%, industry – 23%, construction – 6%, real estate operations – 2.3%, transport and communications – more than 2%.

 Industry 

In the industrial sector of the city, there are 10 branches, which have 70 large enterprises with a total number of employees over 20 thousand people or 13% of the working population of the city. The annual volume of industrial production at these enterprises is about 775 million UAH. The share of citywide tax revenues to the budgets of all levels of the industry is 21%. Defining industries in the city's industry are food, light, mechanical engineering and woodworking. Defining industries in the city's industry are food, light, mechanical engineering and woodworking. Food processing companies produce sugar, bakery products, alcohol, oil, meat and milk, fruits, vegetables and other products. In the light industry, the production of garments, knitwear, hosiery, rubber and leather footwear and textiles prevails. Mechanical engineering is represented by the production of oil and gas processing equipment and agricultural machinery. The timber industry is dominated by the production of lumber, furniture, joinery and other wood products.

 Trade and services 
In 2005, there were 1922 trade enterprises, 609 restaurants, 892 services in the city. There are 22 markets and micro-markets in the city. 10 million UAH are invested annually in their construction, reconstruction, improvement of trade conditions and creation of facilities for buyers. Chernivtsi City Shopping Complex, "Kalinivskiy Rynok" Municipal Enterprise is a modern multidisciplinary enterprise with powerful infrastructure. The average daily number of market visitors is 50,000 people, served by 9,100 entrepreneurs. The volume of services in 2005 amounted to almost UAH 23 million, more than UAH 18 million was paid into the city budget, or nearly 10% of the total revenues.

 Health care 

Almost all health care establishments of the region are concentrated in Chernivtsi. 39 medical establishments (hospitals, clinics, and polyclinics) provide citizens of Chernivtsi with necessary medical care. Medical services are provided by 4.47 thousand people, of which – 1102 doctors, 1902 – average health workers, 1473 – junior and support staff.

Municipal medical establishments provide the following medical services:

 Emergency care (emergency care station);
Dispensary and polyclinic care (5 municipal polyclinics, a municipal children polyclinic, polyclinics of two maternity houses, a polyclinic of preventive examination and Municipal Dentistry Association, which includes two dentist clinics);
Specialized medical care (3 hospitals, 2 maternity houses, a tuberculosis hospital and a municipal children hospital);
Disease-prevention and anti-epidemic services (a municipal sanitary and epidemiological station).

 Culture 

Throughout centuries Chernivtsi, as the center of Bukovina, was forming as a multinational city with tolerance atmosphere which became the cradle of artists representing different cultures.

The city has 2 theaters, a philharmonic, organ hall  (in the Armenian Catholic Church), more than 10 museums, 6 cinemas, 31 libraries,  central palace of culture, 4 music schools and fine arts school. The city has more than 100 religious organizations and diocesan authorities, 4 religious institutions. More than a dozen of active non-profit cultural organizations operate in Chernivtsi, including A.Mickiewicz Polish Culture Society, M.Eminescu Romanian Culture Society, Society of Austrian and German Culture.

Since 1997 Chernivtsi has hosted an international art event under "Days of European Culture Heritage" project. Every year "Bukovinian Meetings" folklore festival is held during the City Day in which art groups from Poland, Hungary, Romania and Germany take part.

Important part of Chernivtsi cultural life is Malanka Fest, Ukraine's main carnival timed to the religious St. Melania ("Malanka") Day and St. Basil Day. Respectively, this is usually conducted on 14 January, although this date may be moved a bit to match the weekend. During the Festival groups from different towns and settlements of Bukovina compete in the artistic ingenuity.

One of the biggest literary festival in Ukraine is the Meridian Czernowitz International Poetic Festival. The purpose of the festival is to return Chernivtsi to the cultural map of Europe and to develop a dialogue between contemporary Ukrainian poets and their foreign colleagues. The participants of Meridian Czernowitz are famous and interesting poets from Germany, Austria, Switzerland, Great Britain, United States, Denmark, Netherlands, Luxembourg, Liechtenstein, Poland, Romania, Russia, Ukraine and others.

 Museums 

Chernivtsi Regional Museum (O. Kobylyanska St., 28) has the largest collection of materials and artefacts of the nature, history, and culture of Northern Bukovina: a collection of old printed books with a unique Ostroh Bible, printed by Ivan Fedorov in 1581; numismatic collection with more than 3 thousand coins; an interesting collection of weapons; an archaeological collection of more than 12,000 museum objects. The pride of the museum is a collection of works of fine and decorative arts, the basis of which consists of icons of the 16th to 18th centuries, works of prominent Bukovinian artists. The natural collection includes nearly 10,000 natural specimens (stuffed animals, wet preparations, herbarium, entomological collections, etc.);
Chernivtsi Art Museum (Central Square, 10). The building itself has artistic value: in its design masterfully combined sculpture, painting, stained glass, artistic metal. The total number of exhibits in the museum exceeds 8400. A collection of unique Bukovinian folk images and icons on glass of the 19th to 20th centuries, Bukovinian folk rugs of the 19th to 20th centuries, Bukovina and Hutsul pysankas are saved here, as well as such rare monuments as the composition " Last Judgment ", Bukovinian icons of the 17th to 20th centuries. and old printed books, including "The Apostle" 1632. The paintings of the Art Museum feature, in general, rare canvases belonging to the brushes of famous Bukovinian painters who worked predominantly in a classical manner.
History and Culture Museum of Bukovinian Jews (Theater Square, 10). Located in the former Jewish People's House (now the Central City Palace of Culture). The main concept of the museum is to reflect and emphasize the characteristics of Bukovina Jewry – the Bukovina phenomenon of the 19th to early 20th centuries which differed significantly from the phenomena of neighbouring Galician, Bessarabian and Podolian Jewry.
Museum of the Bukovina Diaspora (Josef Hlávka St., 1);
Chernivtsi Regional Museum of Folk Architecture and Life (Svitlovodska Street, 2) is an architectural and landscape complex consisting of monuments of folk architecture of the late 18th to first half of the 20th centuries. An ancient village of Bukovina is open to the sky, where you can get acquainted with the folk architecture and way of life of Bukovinians from different regions and ethnographic groups. The exposition of the museum includes about 35 structures, transported from different parts of the region and reconstructed in original form with appropriate natural surroundings.
Olga Kobylyanska Literary Memorial Museum (Okunevska St., 5);
Yuriy Fedkovich Literary Memorial Museum (Soborna Square, 10);
Volodymyr Ivasyuk Memorial Museum (Mayakovsky St., 40/1);
Aviation and Space Museum.

 Architecture 
There are many places which attract citizens of Chernivtsi and the visitors: Drama Theatre, Regional Philharmonic Society, Organ and Chamber Music Hall, puppet-theatre, Museum of Local Lore, History and Economy, Museum of Fine Arts, Bukovinian Diaspora Museum, Museum of Folk Architecture and Way of Life, memorial museums of writers, the Central Palace of Culture, the Star Alley in Teatralna Square.

The city of Chernivtsi has a lot of architecturally important buildings. Many historic buildings have been preserved, especially within the city's center. However, after years of disrepair and neglect, the buildings are in need of major restoration. 

As Chernivtsi was part of the Austro-Hungarian Empire, it was closely related to the empire's culture, including architecture.  Main architectural styles present within the city include Vienna Secession and Neoclassicism, Baroque, late Gothic architecture, and fragments of traditional Moldavian and Hungarian architecture, Byzantine architecture as well as Cubism. During the Interwar Romanian administration, a great number of buildings in the Neo-Romanian and Art Deco architectural styles were also built.The city is sometimes dubbed Little Vienna, because its architecture is reminiscent of the Austro-Hungarian capital Vienna.

The main architectural attractions of the city include: the Chernivtsi Drama Theater (1905); the Chernivtsi University—UNESCO World Heritage Site (1882); the Regional Museum of Fine Arts—the former savings bank (1900); the Regional Council—former Palace of Justice (1906); and the Chernivtsi Palace of Culture—former Jewish National House (1908); among many others. The magnificent Moorish Revival Czernowitz Synagogue was heavily damaged by fire in 1941, the walls were used to create the  "Chernivtsi" movie theater.

The Czech architect Josef Hlávka designed, in 1864–1882, the buildings that currently house the Chernivtsi State University. They were originally the residence of the Bukovinian and Dalmatian Metropolitans. The Romanesque and Byzantine architecture is embellished with motifs of Ukrainian folk art; for example, the tile roof patterns duplicate the geometric designs of traditional Ukrainian embroidery.

 Polish National House in Chernivtsi 

The history of the Polish community in Chernivtsi dates back to the late 18th century, when authorities of the Habsburg Empire encouraged Poles to move to Bucovina. By the mid-19th century, several Polish organizations existed in the city, including Bratnia Pomoc (Brotherly Aid) and Czytelnia Polska (Polish Reading Room). On the initiative of publishers of the Gazeta Polska daily newspaper, collection of money for the construction of Polish House was initiated. In early 20th century, two Polish activists, doctor Tadeusz Mischke and judge Jakub Simonowicz purchased a house. In 1904, its expansion was initiated. It was carried out by architect Franciszek Skowron, interior decorator Konrad Górecki and sculptors from Zakopane, Skwarnicki and Gerasimowicz. The expansion was completed in 1905, and Polish House operated until World War II.

In 1945, Soviet authorities opened here a cinema, later a music school. Currently, the complex houses Adam Mickiewicz Association of Polish Culture.

Apart from the Polish House, Chernivtsi also has German, Romanian and Jewish Houses.

 German National House in Chernivtsi 

It was built in the early 20th century by the union of the German community in Chernivtsi, which became the center of German cultural and social life in Chernivtsi and Bukovina. The German House was built in 1908–1910 according to plans developed by architect Gustav Fric. The building measures 1700 square metres, 25,000 cubic metres. built as a profitable house and a partnership house for 700,000 kroons on the site of the old German school building. The German House also had its own bank, and its own printing house, where various books, brochures, newspapers, and magazines were published, including the newspaper "German diary", which was popular at the time.

 Jewish National House in Chernivtsi 

The house was built in 1908 by the Jewish community and until the Second World War, it was the centre of Jewish life in Chernivtsi and home to various Jewish associations and organisations. At least 45,000 Jews from the Bukovina region fell victim to mass shootings, forced labour and deportations beginning in 1941. With the advent of the Soviet government (1944), the building was transferred to the City House of Culture.  Today it is the Central Palace of Culture of Chernivtsi

 Religion 

 Cathedral of the Holy Spirit (Svyatodukhivsky Cathedral) is a cathedral of the Ukrainian Orthodox Church (Moscow Patriarchate) in Chernivtsi. The first stone in its foundation was laid in July 1844. The construction was carried out under the supervision of local engineer A. Marin and Viennese architect A. Röll. In 1860 the facade of the temple was rebuilt under the design of Josef Hlavka. Twenty years after the work began in July 1864, Bishop Yevgeny Hakman consecrated the cathedral. However, interior decoration work continued until the end of the century. In 1892–1896 a group of artists from Vienna painted the walls. It was built in the style of the Italian Renaissance, and one of the projects of the St. Isaac's Cathedral, which was presented to Bishop Yevgeny Hakman during his pilgrimage to the Trinity Lavra of St. Sergius.
 The Ukrainian Greek Catholic Church has a large number of believers in Chernivtsi who are increasing every year. Currently, several temples have been built in the city. The main temple representing the UGCC in Bukovina is the Cathedral of the Assumption of the Blessed Virgin Mary, which was recently 190 years old. It also bears the title of the oldest temple built in Bukovina over the last several centuries. On 12 September 2017, Pope Francis confirmed the decision of the Synod of Bishops of the UGCC to establish a separate Chernivtsi eparchy and to appoint its Bishop Yosafat Moschych.
The Armenian Church of Chernivtsi is the existing Armenian Catholic Church of the Eastern Rite of the Holy Apostles Peter and Paul in the city of Chernivtsi. The temple was built and consecrated in 1875. He functioned intermittently during the Soviet rule in Bukovina. The temple is included in the list of city buildings protected by the law of Ukraine.
Basilica of the Exaltation of the Holy Cross (Chernivtsi) is a Roman Catholic church with the status of a small basilica, the first stone building of the city. Its history begins when Bukovina joined Austria in 1774. At the time of Bukovina's annexation to Austria, there were no Roman Catholic temples in the province. The first holy mass was held at the wooden house of General Gabriel von Spleny, the first Austrian governor of Bukovina, attended by only a small number of Roman Catholics. In 1778 the building of the first church in Chernivtsi was completed. The architectural structure of the Church of the Exaltation of the Holy Cross is characterized by classic features. There are also numerous chapels and churches in different districts of the city.

The Residence of Bukovinian and Dalmatian Metropolitans is included in the UNESCO list of Architectural Heritage.

 Education 
Chernivtsi is a known scientific and educational center in Western Ukraine. Research Institutes of Thermoelectricity, the Institute of Medical and Ecological Problems of the Ministry of Health Care of Ukraine, Chernivtsi National University, Bukovinian State Medical University, Trade and Economics Institute, Institute of Economics and Law, Bukovinian State Institute for Finance and Economics.

Secondary education in Chernivtsi is provided by:

 46 high schools with the Ukrainian language of study – 97.3% of students;
 4 high schools with the Romanian language of study – 2.7%;
2 private schools: Hope and Harmony.
3 lyceums and 7 gymnasium.

There are 5 gymnasiums, 3 lyceums, and 3 sport schools, the Municipal Center of Science, "Young Technicians" Club, "GERDAN" Theatre-Studio.

There are 15 higher educational institutions (universities, institutes, colleges). Among them:

Yuriy Fedkovych Chernivtsi National University (19,227 students) – one of the few classic universities in the country. It was opened on 4 October 1875, according to the decree of the Austrian Emperor Franz Joseph. At that time the university consisted of three faculties: philosophical, theological and law. Today, 16 faculties and the Chernivtsi Pedagogical College within the ChNU are functioning at the university. Almost 13,000 students study in 61 specialities; the main areas of preparation are the natural sciences, and the humanities. This is the only university in the country where civilian theologians are trained.
Bukovinian State Medical University (4321 students). The teaching process at the 42 departments is provided by 75 doctors and 321 candidates of sciences. The teaching staff provides training for 4,474 students, including 675 students from 35 countries. Foreign students are taught in English. The Faculty of Postgraduate Education trains about 800 interns and over 2000 attending physicians; the university provides continuity and continuity of higher medical education: junior specialist, bachelor, doctor-specialist, master, graduate student. BSMU prepares specialists in the specialties "Medical Affairs", "Pediatrics", "Dentistry", "Medical Psychology", "Clinical Pharmacy", "Pharmacy", "Nursing", "Laboratory diagnostics".
 Chernivtsi Trade-Economics Institute of the Kyiv National University of Trade and Economics (2315 students). The university trains specialists in the field of internal and foreign trade, restaurant business, state financial system and law, customs service, antitrust activity, business economics, banking and insurance, tax and accounting and control, audit, tourism, hospitality, household and other links in the infrastructure.
Bukovinian University (the first private higher educational institution in the region) – 1,273 students.
Bukovinian State Institute for Finance and Economics – 1,268 students.
Chernivtsi Branch of the Interregional Academy of Personnel Management.

 Sports 
The most popular kinds of sports in Chernivtsi include archery, judo, field hockey, karate, power-lifting and orienteering. Chernivtsi's baseball, ice hockey, and football clubs (FC Bukovyna Chernivtsi) are participants in the Ukrainian national championships.

Chernivtsi has a large number of sports establishments and facilities, including five stadiums, 186 sports grounds, two tennis courts, eleven football fields, five skating rinks, 21 shooting galleries, three swimming pools, 69 gyms, 62 gyms with special training equipment, and an international motorcycle racing track.

Over 7,950 inhabitants are members of sport clubs within the city, and more than 50,000 people participate in various sport activities. Currently, eight sportsmen from the city are members of national teams and twelve are members of national youth teams. Three athletes from Chernivtsi were prize-winners in various world tournaments, two were winners of European and 42 of national championships in 2002.

Chernivtsi has been host to the Sidecross World Championship a number of times, most recently in June 2010.

 Transport 
 
Chernivtsi public transport divides on two groups: trolleys and buses. All modes of transport cost approximately $0.20 .
In 2018, Chernivtsi has begun testing its innovative hybrid trolleybuses. The new trolleybuses are designed to improve the public transport system of Chernivtsi by making it more energy-efficient, as well as covering the part of the town which currently has no trolleybus lines.

 Rail 

 Air 
Flights to Kyiv, Athens, Istanbul and Naples among others.

 Road 
Chernivtsi has access to the M19 highway, which is part of the European route E85, which links it to Bucharest (south) and Ternopil and Lutsk (north).

 International relations 

 Twin towns—Sister cities 
The first international contacts with the city were established on 20 July 1989, when then-Mayor of Chernivtsi City Council Pavel Kaspruk,  signed a twinning agreement with the Mayor of Salt Lake City (USA) – Lowell Turner. To commemorate this event, the Cradle of Peace was erected in Chernivtsi.

Chernivtsi is twinned with:

Former twin cities

In February 2016 the Chernivtsi city council terminated its twinned relations with the Russian cities Bryansk and Podolsk due to the Russo-Ukrainian War.

 Notable people 

 Natives 

 Sophia Agranovich, American classical concert pianist, Centaur Records recording artist and music educator
 Aharon Appelfeld (1932–2018), Jewish writer
 Zamfir Arbore (1848–1933), Romanian politician
 Ninon Ausländer (1895–1966), art historian and wife of Hermann Hesse
 Rose Ausländer (1901–1988), Jewish German-language writer
 Elyakim Badian (1925–2000), Israeli politician
 Leon Birnbaum (1918–2010), Romanian mathematician and philosopher
 Charles K. Bliss (1897–1985), inventor of Blissymbolics
 Ion Bostan (1914–1992), Romanian film director
 Octav Botnar (1913–1998), Romanian businessman, philanthropist, billionaire
 Josef Burg (1912–2009), last Yiddish poet in Chernivtsi
 Paul Celan (1920–1970), German-language poet and translator
 Erwin Chargaff (1905–2002), Jewish biochemist
 Eugen Ehrlich (1862–1922), Jewish jurist, pioneer of the field of sociology of law
 Natalia Fedner (born 1983), Ukrainian-American fashion designer
 Moysey Fishbeyn (1947–2020), a Ukrainian poet
 Maria Forescu (1875–1943/1947), Romanian opera singer and film actress
 Rudolf Gerlach-Rusnak (1895–1960), German operatic and concert lyrical tenor
 Max Glücksmann (1875–1946), Argentine Jewish pioneer of the music and film industries
 George Grigorovici (1871–1950), Romanian politician
 Radu Grigorovici (1911–2008), Romanian physicist
 Dmytro Hnatyuk (1925–2016), a Ukrainian baritone opera singer
 Frederick John Kiesler (1890–1965), a theater designer, artist, theoretician and architect
 Ruth Klieger Aliav (1914–1979), Romanian-Israeli Jewish activist
 Sam Kogan (1946–2004), stage director, actor and founding principal of the Academy of the Science of Acting and Directing in London
Renata Kallosh (born 1943), theoretical physicist 
 Mila Kunis (born 1983), American actress
 Elena Leușteanu (1935–2008), Romanian Olympic gymnast
 Ani Lorak (born 1978), Ukrainian singer, songwriter, actress
 Eusebius Mandyczewski (1857–1929), Ukrainian-Romanian musicologist and composer
 Itzik Manger (1901–1969), Yiddish writer
 Georg Marco (1863–1923), Austrian chess player and author
 Meinhard E. Mayer (1929–2011), Romanian-American mathematician and physicist, Professor Emeritus of Physics and Mathematics at the University of California
 Volodymyr Melnykov (born 1951), Ukrainian poet, writer and composer
 Jan Mikulicz-Radecki (1850–1905), Polish surgeon
 Ingrid Nargang (1929–2019), Austrian lawyer and contemporary historian
 Dan Pagis (1930–1986), Israeli writer
 Emil Paur (1855–1932), conductor 
 Traian Popovici (1892–1946), Romanian lawyer, mayor of Chernivtsi, and a Righteous Among the Nations for saving 20,000 Jews during the Holocaust
 Iacob Pistiner, lawyer and Member of the Romanian Parliament in the interwar years
 Aron Pumnul (1818–1866), Romanian philologist and teacher, national and revolutionary activist
 Bernard Reder, sculptor
 Markus Reiner (1886–1976), one of the founders of rheology
 Gregor von Rezzori (1914–1998), German-language writer of Sicilian-Austrian origin
 Ludwig Rottenberg (1864–1932), conductor and composer
 Maximilien Rubel (1905–1996), Marxist historian 
 Lev Shekhtman (born 1951), Russian-American theater director and actor
 Ze'ev Sherf (1904–1984), Israeli Minister of Finance
 Jan Tabachnyk (born 1945), singer and composer
 Sidi Tal (1912–1983), singer and actress
 Inna Tsymbalyuk (born 1985), Ukrainian model and actress; semifinalist at Miss Universe 2006.
 Viorica Ursuleac (1894–1985), Romanian opera singer (dramatic soprano)
 Inna Vernikov (Born 1984) New York City Councilwoman
 Sofia Vicoveanca (born 1941), Romanian singer of popular music from the Bukovina region
 Roman Vlad (1919–2013) Romanian-Italian composer, pianist, and musicologist
 Sydir Vorobkevych (1836–1903) Ukrainian composer and writer
 Ruth Wisse, professor of literature
 Mariya Yaremchuk (born 1993), Ukrainian singer, represented Ukraine in the Eurovision Song Contest 2014
 Arseniy Yatsenyuk (born 1974), Ukrainian politician
 Frederic Zelnik (1885–1950), an important German silent movie director-producer
 Karol Mikuli (1821–1897), Polish-Romanian musician of Armenian descent

 Residents 

 Moyshe Altman (1890–1981), Yiddish writer
 Hermann Bahr
 Nicolae Bălan (1882–1955), Romanian cleric, a metropolitan bishop of the Romanian Orthodox Church
 Grigore Vasiliu Birlic (1905–1970), Romanian actor
 Nathan Birnbaum
 Charles K. Bliss
 Nikolay Bogolyubov
 Traian Brăileanu (1882–1947), Romanian sociologist and politician
 Romulus Cândea (1886–1973), Romanian ecclesiastical historian
 Erwin Chargaff
 Nicolae Cotos (1883–1959), Romanian theologian
 Mihai Eminescu (1850–1889), Romanian poet, novelist and journalist
 Iancu Flondor (1865–1924), Romanian activist who advocated Bukovina's unification with the Kingdom of Romania
 Jacob Frank (1726–1791), Polish rabbi and founder of Frankism
 Ivan Franko
 Karl Emil Franzos (1848–1904), Jewish writer and publicist, grew up in Chernivtsi and wrote a literary memorial of the Jewish ghetto, The Jews of Barnow''
 Constantin Isopescu-Grecul (1871–1938), Romanian jurist, politician and journalist
 Gala Galaction (1879–1961), Romanian writer
 Abraham Goldfaden, active here
 Zygmunt Gorgolewski
 Ion Grămadă (1886—1917) Romanian writer, historian and journalist
 Marian Hadenko (1955–2021), Ukrainian singer, songwriter and composer
 Maximilian Hacman (1877–1961), Romanian jurist
 Hans Hahn
 Eudoxiu Hurmuzachi (1812–1874), Romanian historian, politician (Landeshauptmann of Bukovina) and patriot 
 Volodymyr Ivasyuk (1949–1979), Ukrainian singer, songwriter and poet
 Joseph Kalmer (1898–1959), Austrian writer, poet and translator
 Leonid Kravchuk, first President of Ukraine from 1991 to 1994
 Olha Kobylyanska
 Zvi Laron
 Vasile Luca (1898–1963), Soviet and Romanian communist politician
 Anastasiya Markovich (born 1979), painter
 Karol Mikuli (1821–1892), Romanian pianist and composer, student of Frédéric Chopin
 Ivan Mykolaychuk (1941–1987)
 Grigore Nandriș (1895–1968), Romanian linguist, philologist and memoirist
 Miron Nicolescu (1903–1975), Romanian mathematician
 Ion Nistor (1876–1962), Romanian historian and politician
 Aurel Onciul
 Dimitrie Onciul (1856–1923), Romanian historian
 Dimitrie Petrino
 Israel Polack
 George Popovici (1863–1905), Romanian agrarian politician, jurist and poet
 Ciprian Porumbescu (1853–1883), Romanian composer
 Aron Pumnul (1818–1866), Romanian philologist and teacher, national and revolutionary activist
 Sextil Pușcariu
 Florin Piersic (born 1936), Romanian actor and TV personality
 Wilhelm Reich (1897–1957), Jewish psychoanalyst and sexologist, born in Dobrzanica, went to school in Chernivtsi
 Eric Roll, Baron Roll of Ipsden (1907–2005),
 Sofia Rotaru (born 1947), Romanian-Ukrainian pop singer
 Wojciech Rubinowicz
 Ion G. Sbiera (1836–1916), Romanian folklorist and historian
 Joseph Schmidt (1904–1942) singer, actor and cantor
 Fritz von Scholz (1896–1944), SS officer
 Joseph Schumpeter (1883–1950), economist and Minister of Finance, 1909–1911, professor in Chernivtsi
 Wilhelm Stekel (1868–1940), Jewish psychoanalyst and sexologist, born in Boiany, grew up in Chernivtsi and attended the Gymnasium (grammar school)
 Benno Straucher
 Vasile Tărâțeanu (1945–2022), Romanian journalist and writer
 Georg Wassilko von Serecki
 Salo Weisselberger
 Nazariy Yaremchuk (1951–1995), Hutsul singer
 Léon d'Ymbault (–1781), mayor 
 George Mihalcheon
 Nissan Spivak
 Emilian Voiutschi
 Kassian Bogatyrets

Gallery

See also 
 List of people from Chernivtsi

References

External links 

 Information Portal Chernivtsi
 
 
 Chernivtsi article by Vladislav Davidzon  Tablet Magazine
 "Per le vie di Chernivtsi, città dei sogni yiddish" article by Tommy Cappellini Corriere del Ticino (Italian)
 Chernivtsi Photos
 
Virtual 3D Tour

 
Oblast centers in Ukraine
Cities of regional significance in Ukraine
Magdeburg rights
Bukovina
Duchy of Bukovina
Capitals of former Romanian counties
Ținutul Suceava
Shtetls
Holocaust locations in Ukraine
Cities in Chernivtsi Oblast
Populated places on the Prut